The 2007 WNBA season was their ninth season and their fifth in Connecticut. The Sun attempted to return to the postseason for the fifth consecutive season and were successful.

Offseason

Dispersal Draft
Based on the Sun's 2006 record, they would pick 13th (last) in the Charlotte Sting dispersal draft. The Sun waived their pick.

WNBA Draft

Transactions
June 8: The Sun sign Evanthia Maltsi.
May 18: The Sun waive Laura Summerton.
May 13: The Sun waive Kiera Hardy.
May 11: The Sun waive Vanessa Gidden and Brooke Smith.
May 8: The Sun waive Adrienne Davie.
April 29: The Sun sign Brooke Smith.
April 25: The Sun waive Monique Martin.
March 5: The Sun re-sign Laura Summerton.
February 22: The Sun re-sign Jamie Carey.
February 21: The Sun trade Taj McWilliams-Franklin to the Los Angeles Sparks for the rights to Érika de Souza and the Sparks’ first pick (12th overall) in the 2007 draft.
February 21: The Sun sign free agent Kristen Rasmussen.
February 7: The Sun re-sign Katie Douglas and Le'Coe Willingham.

Roster

Season standings

Schedule

Preseason

|- align="center" bgcolor="bbffbb"
| 1 || May 5 || New York || W 61-60 || Hardy (12) || Rasmussen (7) || Rasmussen (4) || Arena at Harbor Yard  N/A || 1-0
|- align="center" bgcolor="ffbbbb"
| 2 || May 8 || Seattle || L 55-63 || Douglas (16) || Willingham (9) || Carey (4) || Mohegan Sun Arena  5,607 || 1-1
|- align="center" bgcolor="ffbbbb"
| 3 || May 15 || @ San Antonio || L 53-86 || Whalen (14) || Jones (5) || Jones, Carey (2) || AT&T Center  3,296 || 1-2
|-

Regular season

|- align="center" bgcolor="bbffbb"
| 1
|  May 19
|  @ Washington
| W 89-80
| Sales (20)
| Jones, Dydek (6)
| Douglas, Jones (4)
| Verizon Center  8,042
| 1-0
|- align="center" bgcolor="ffbbbb"
| 2
|  May 23
|  @ San Antonio
| L 71-74
| Douglas (21)
| Jones (9)
| Douglas (8)
| AT&T Center  8,574
| 1-1
|- align="center" bgcolor="ffbbbb"
| 3
|  May 26
|  Los Angeles
| L 68-88
| Sales (17)
| de Souza (9)
| Whalen (5)
| Mohegan Sun Arena  8,003
| 1-2
|- align="center" bgcolor="bbffbb"
| 4
|  May 31
|  @ Chicago
| W 102-97 (OT)
| Jones (31)
| Jones (9)
| Douglas (7)
| UIC Pavilion  2,634
| 2-2
|-

|- align="center" bgcolor="bbffbb"
| 5
|  June 2
|  Phoenix
| W 76-67
| Jones (24)
| Douglas (9)
| Whalen (6)
| Mohegan Sun Arena  8,881
| 3-2
|- align="center" bgcolor="bbffbb"
| 6
|  June 8
|  @ Houston
| W 88-77
| Sales (26)
| Dydek (11)
| Douglas (6)
| Toyota Center  7,339
| 4-2
|- align="center" bgcolor="ffbbbb"
| 7
|  June 10
|  Detroit
| L 74-79
| Jones (20)
| Dydek (9)
| Jones (5)
| Mohegan Sun Arena  7,724
| 4-3
|- align="center" bgcolor="ffbbbb"
| 8
|  June 13
|  @ Minnesota
| L 73-77 (OT)
| Jones (22)
| Jones (10)
| Douglas (6)
| Target Center  9,382
| 4-4
|- align="center" bgcolor="ffbbbb"
| 9
|  June 15
|  @ Detroit
| L 72-75
| Sales (18)
| Dydek (8)
| Whalen (5)
| Palace of Auburn Hills  8,484
| 4-5
|- align="center" bgcolor="ffbbbb"
| 10
|  June 17
|  Chicago
| L 74-87
| Jones (22)
| Jones (12)
| Douglas (5)
| Mohegan Sun Arena  7,614
| 4-6
|- align="center" bgcolor="ffbbbb"
| 11
|  June 20
|  New York
| L 73-76
| Douglas, Sales (17)
| Whalen (8)
| Whalen (10)
| Mohegan Sun Arena  6,154
| 4-7
|- align="center" bgcolor="bbffbb"
| 12
|  June 22
|  @ Indiana
| W 78-74
| Douglas (30)
| Dydek (10)
| Whalen (7)
| Conseco Fieldhouse  7,240
| 5-7
|- align="center" bgcolor="ffbbbb"
| 13
|  June 23
|  San Antonio
| L 58-71
| Douglas, Whalen (15)
| Dydek (8)
| Douglas (3)
| Mohegan Sun Arena  6,887
| 5-8
|- align="center" bgcolor="ffbbbb"
| 14
|  June 26
|  Washington
| L 75-91
| Douglas (19)
| Dydek (10)
| Whalen (6)
| Mohegan Sun Arena  6,353
| 5-9
|- align="center" bgcolor="ffbbbb"
| 15
|  June 27
|  @ Detroit
| L 74-77
| Jones (16)
| Jones (9)
| Douglas, Whalen (4)
| Palace of Auburn Hills  8,521
| 5-10
|- align="center" bgcolor="bbffbb"
| 16
|  June 29
|  Indiana
| W 72-67
| Douglas (22)
| Dydek (13)
| Whalen (7)
| Mohegan Sun Arena  7,617
| 6-10
|-

|- align="center" bgcolor="ffbbbb"
| 17
|  July 6
|  @ Phoenix
| L 109-111 (2 OT)
| Jones, Sales (22)
| Rasmussen (13)
| Jones (6)
| US Airways Center  7,131
| 6-11
|- align="center" bgcolor="bbffbb"
| 18
|  July 7
|  @ Los Angeles
| W 110-89
| Douglas (28)
| Dydek (7)
| Whalen (8)
| STAPLES Center  8,769
| 7-11
|- align="center" bgcolor="bbffbb"
| 19
|  July 11
|  @ Seattle
| W 76-63
| Douglas (17)
| Jones (9)
| Whalen, Douglas (4)
| KeyArena  10,891
| 8-11
|- align="center" bgcolor="bbffbb"
| 20
|  July 12
|  @ Sacramento
| W 82-78 (OT)
| Sales (23)
| Dydek (9)
| Whalen (8)
| ARCO Arena  6,498
| 9-11
|- align="center" bgcolor="bbffbb"
| 21
|  July 17
|  Minnesota
| W 84-79
| Douglas (22)
| Sales, Dydek,  Willingham (5)
| Whalen, Sales (4)
| Mohegan Sun Arena  8,253
| 10-11
|- align="center" bgcolor="bbffbb"
| 22
|  July 20
|  Seattle
| W 76-58
| Whalen (19)
| Jones (10)
| Douglas (6)
| Mohegan Sun Arena  9,003
| 11-11
|- align="center" bgcolor="bbffbb"
| 23
|  July 22
|  Houston
| W 81-79
| Douglas (25)
| Douglas, Whalen,  Dydek (6)
| Whalen (6)
| Mohegan Sun Arena  7,869
| 12-11
|- align="center" bgcolor="ffbbbb"
| 24
|  July 24
|  Detroit
| L 88-92
| Whalen (33)
| de Souza (9)
| Whalen (7)
| Mohegan Sun Arena  8,192
| 13-11
|- align="center" bgcolor="bbffbb"
| 25
|  July 26
|  New York
| W 79-75
| Whalen (20)
| Whalen, de Souza (9)
| Whalen (8)
| Mohegan Sun Arena  N/A
| 14-11
|- align="center" bgcolor="ffbbbb"
| 26
|  July 29
|  @ New York
| L 67-61
| Douglas (26)
| Maltsi (8)
| Jones (4)
| Madison Square Garden  8,303
| 14-12
|- align="center" bgcolor="bbffbb"
| 27
|  July 31
|  Chicago
| W 74-56
| Douglas (18)
| Jones (9)
| Sales (5)
| Mohegan Sun Arena  8,048
| 15-12
|-

|- align="center" bgcolor="bbffbb"
| 28
|  August 4
|  Indiana
| W 84-59
| Douglas (19)
| Dydek (9)
| Douglas (5)
| Mohegan Sun Arena  9,493
| 16-12
|- align="center" bgcolor="ffbbbb"
| 29
|  August 7
|  Sacramento
| L 79-81
| Whalen, Jones (17)
| Jones (6)
| Whalen (7)
| Mohegan Sun Arena  8,930
| 16-13
|- align="center" bgcolor="bbffbb"
| 30
|  August 11
|  @ Chicago
| W 88-66
| Dydek (18)
| Dydek (6)
| Whalen (7)
| UIC Pavilion  4,261
| 17-13
|- align="center" bgcolor="ffbbbb"
| 31
|  August 14
|  @ Washington
| L 64-65
| Dydek (17)
| Dydek (11)
| Whalen (5)
| Verizon Center  N/A
| 17-14
|- align="center" bgcolor="bbffbb"
| 32
|  August 15
|  @ Indiana
| W 77-74
| Sales (32)
| de Souza (6)
| Rasmussen (3)
| Conseco Fieldhouse  6,433
| 18-14
|- align="center" bgcolor="ffbbbb"
| 33
|  August 17
|  @ New York
| L 66-74
| Douglas (22)
| Whalen, Rasmussen,  Willingham (5)
| Whalen (4)
| Madison Square Garden  8,622
| 18-15
|- align="center" bgcolor="ffbbbb"
| 34
|  August 19
|  Washington
| L 74-76
| Douglas (21)
| Douglas (9)
| Whalen (7)
| Mohegan Sun Arena  9,518 (sellout)
| 18-16
|-

Playoffs
In the first round of the Eastern Conference Playoffs, the Sun had to face the Indiana Fever. Since the Fever had the better record, the series would be played with game 1 at Connecticut, game 2 at Indiana, and game 3 (if needed) at Indiana. The Sun won the first game at home in triple-overtime, but the Fever went on to win games two and three and take the series.
For the fifth consecutive season, the Sun qualify for the Eastern Conference Playoffs.
For the first time in franchise history, the Sun lose in the first round of the playoffs and do not advance to the Eastern Conference Finals.

|- align="center" bgcolor="bbffbb"
| 1
|  August 23
|  Indiana
| W 93-88 (3 OT)
| Sales (25)
| Dydek (11)
| Whalen (10)
| Mohegan Sun Arena  7,271
| 1-0
|- align="center" bgcolor="ffbbbb"
| 2
|  August 25
|  @ Indiana
| L 59-78
| Douglas (11)
| Sales (6)
| Carey (4)
| Conseco Fieldhouse  7,298
| 1-1
|- align="center" bgcolor="ffbbbb"
| 3
|  August 27
|  @ Indiana
| L 88-93 (OT)
| Douglas (27)
| Whalen (10)
| Douglas, Jones (5)
| Conseco Fieldhouse  6,012
| 1-2
|-

Depth

Player stats
http://www.wnba.com/sun/stats/2007/

Awards and honors
Katie Douglas and Asjha Jones were named reserves for the 2007 Eastern Conference All-Star Team.
Katie Douglas was named to the WNBA All-Defensive First Team for the third consecutive year.
Margo Dydek was named to the WNBA All-Defensive Second Team for the second consecutive year.
Katie Douglas was named to the All-WNBA Second Team.
Asjha Jones was named WNBA Eastern Conference Player of the Week for the week of June 4, 2007.
Lindsay Whalen was named WNBA Eastern Conference Player of the Week for the week of July 23, 2007.
Katie Douglas was named WNBA Eastern Conference Player of the Week for the week of July 30, 2007.

References

External links

Connecticut Sun seasons
Connecticut
Connecticut Sun